Kami Asgar (born May 26, 1965) is an Iranian-American sound editor and film producer. He received an Academy Award nomination for his work on the film Apocalypto (2006), for which he became the first and only Middle Eastern to date to be nominated for Best Sound Editing.

Awards and nominations

See also
 List of Asian Academy Award winners and nominees

References

External links
 

1965 births
Living people
American sound editors
American film producers
American people of Iranian descent